Ana Carolina Sousa (born September 9, 1974) is a Brazilian singer, songwriter and musician.

Career
Carolina has a contralto vocal range. Her musical influence comes from the crib, her grandmother used to sing on the radio, and her great aunt and uncle played percussion, piano, cello, and violin. She grew up listening to Brazilian musical icons such as Chico Buarque, João Bosco, Maria Bethânia as well as international icons such as Nina Simone, Björk, and Alanis Morissette.  She began her career singing in local bars.

With the determination to become a successful professional musician, she left Minas Gerais and moved to Rio de Janeiro. Shortly after moving to Rio de Janeiro, she signed a contract with the BMG recording company. She released her first CD, Ana Carolina, in 1999, which was responsible for her nomination in the Latin Grammy Awards.

Her second album, Ana Rita Joana Iracema e Carolina was another success, released in 2001. The album's title is in reference to songs by the singer Chico Buarque, one of Ana Carolina's idols.  This album contained hits like "Quem de nós dois" and "Ela é bamba".

In 2003, she released her 3rd album, Estampado which showed her musical originality.  Her 4th CD, Ana Carolina: Perfil released in 2004, was a collection of her most successful songs from her first 3 CDs and, according to ABPD, is the best-selling in Brazil in 2005.  Also in 2004 she performed a show with Seu Jorge and released a live CD and DVD of the show called Ana & Jorge.  The song, "É Isso Aí", a Portuguese version of Damien Rice's "The Blower's Daughter", reached the #1 spot on the charts.

Carolina came out in Veja magazine as bisexual in 2005, creating much debate and attracting new fans.  She released her 6th album, Dois Quartos, in 2006. The album contained 2 CDs, the 1st called 'Quarto' and the 2nd called 'Quartinho'.

In December 2017, Alice Caymmi released a song and an accompanying video called "Inocente" that was co-written by Carolina.

Discography

Albums

DVDs

Singles

References

External links
Official Page
Magazine Veja – A nação das cantoras 

1974 births
Bisexual singers
Bisexual songwriters
Bisexual women
Brazilian contraltos
21st-century Brazilian women singers
21st-century Brazilian singers
Brazilian women guitarists
Women bass guitarists
Música Popular Brasileira singers
Música Popular Brasileira guitarists
Brazilian LGBT songwriters
Brazilian LGBT singers
Living people
People from Juiz de Fora
21st-century bass guitarists
20th-century Brazilian LGBT people
21st-century Brazilian LGBT people
Women in Latin music
LGBT people in Latin music
Brazilian bisexual people